Seymour Robbie (August 25, 1919 – June 17, 2004) was a director of American television programs, whose work ranged from 1951 (Down You Go) to 1990 (Father Dowling Mysteries). His credits include game shows (e.g., The $64,000 Question), crime dramas (e.g., Kojak), action-adventure programs (e.g., Wonder Woman), and sitcoms (e.g., F Troop). He was born in New York City.

Filmography

Theatrical and television films
 Art Carney Meets the Sorcerer's Apprentice (1959 TV movie)
 Spirit of the Alamo (1960 TV documentary)
 Beauty and the Beast (1969 TV movie)
 C.C. and Company (1970 theatrical film)
 Marco (1973 theatrical film)

Television series
Robbie directed one or more episodes of each of the following programs during the following years:

References
 

1919 births
2004 deaths
American television directors